Lucien Louis Joseph Napoléon Bonaparte, 4th Prince of Canino and Musignano (15 November 1828 – 19 November 1895), was a French cardinal and member of the House of Bonaparte.

Life and career
He was born in Rome, the son of Charles Lucien Bonaparte and his wife, Zénaïde Bonaparte. His paternal grandparents were Lucien Bonaparte and his second wife, Alexandrine de Bleschamp. His maternal grandparents were Joseph Bonaparte and Julie Clary. His godfather was the future Napoleon III, first cousin to both his parents.

He was ordained to the priesthood on 13 December 1856 by Pope Pius IX, giving up his Italian title. He served at numerous posts both in France and in Italy. He was created Cardinal of Santa Pudenziana in 1868. In 1879, he was given the additional title of Cardinal Priest of S. Lorenzo in Lucina, as in this year Napoleon III's progeny had died out, while cardinal Lucien was the most genetically senior member of the Bonaparte family.

Cardinal Bonaparte participated in the First Vatican Council. He also was one of the voting cardinals that elected Gioacchino Vincenzo Raffaele Luigi Cardinal Pecci, as Pope Leo XIII. He died in 1895 and was buried in Rome.

Ancestry

References

External links

The Cardinals of the Holy Roman Church: Biographical Dictionary: Consistory of 13 March 1868.

1828 births
1895 deaths
Bonaparte, Lucien Louis Joseph Napoleon
Lucien Louis Joseph Napoleon Bonaparte
Bonaparte, Lucien Louis Joseph Napoleon
Cardinals created by Pope Pius IX
Lucien Louis Joseph Napoleon Bonaparte
Lucien Louis Joseph Napoleon Bonaparte
Participants in the First Vatican Council